The 2016 Men's EuroHockey Club Champions Trophy was the 39th edition of the Men's EuroHockey Club Champions Trophy, Europe's secondary club field hockey tournament organized by the European Hockey Federation. It was held from 22 to 25 May 2015 at Three Rock Rovers Hockey Club in Dublin, Ireland.

SC Stroitel Brest won their first title by defeating Slavia Prague 3–1 in the final. Atasport won the bronze medal by defeating the hosts Three Rock Rovers 3–2.

Qualified teams
The following seven teams participated in the tournament.

 Atasport
 Stroitel Brest
 Slavia Prague
 Three Rock Rovers
 Amsicora
 Grange
 OKS-SHVSM
 Whitchurch

Preliminary round

Pool A

Pool B

Classification round

Seventh place game

Fifth place game

Third place game

Final

Final standings
 Stroitel Brest
 Slavia Prague
 Atasport
 Three Rock Rovers
 Grange
 Amsicora
 OKS-SHVSM
 Whitchurch

See also
2014–15 Euro Hockey League
2015 Women's EuroHockey Club Trophy

References

Men's EuroHockey Club Trophy
Club Champions Trophy
International field hockey competitions hosted by Ireland
EuroHockey Club Champions Trophy
EuroHockey Club Champions Trophy
International sports competitions in Dublin (city)
Men's EuroHockey Club Champions Trophy, 2015